ONL may stand for:

 Online, as used in text messaging and academic circles
 Orange and Lemons, a Filipino band
 Order of Newfoundland and Labrador, a title
 Outer nuclear layer, a layer of the retina
 Oosterhuis Lénárd architecture office by Kas Oosterhuis
 Opening Night Live